Alexei Shkotov (born June 22, 1984) is a Russian former professional ice hockey player.

Shkotov was drafted 48th overall by the St. Louis Blues in the 2002 NHL Entry Draft. He joined the Blues organization in 2004 during the locked-out 2004-05 season and played for the Worcester IceCats of the American Hockey League. He played just 23 games for the IceCats before returning to Russia.

Career statistics

Regular season and playoffs

International

External links
 

1984 births
Living people
Atlant Moscow Oblast players
HC CSKA Moscow players
HC Khimik Voskresensk players
HC Sibir Novosibirsk players
HC Spartak Moscow players
Moncton Wildcats players
People from Elektrostal
Quebec Remparts players
Russian ice hockey centres
St. Louis Blues draft picks
Salavat Yulaev Ufa players
Worcester IceCats players
Sportspeople from Moscow Oblast